The 1990 Purdue Boilermakers football team represented Purdue University as a member of the Big Ten Conference during the 1990 NCAA Division I-A football season. Led by Fred Akers in his fourth and final season as head coach, the Boilermakers compiled an overall record of 2–9 with a mark of 1–7 in conference play, tying for eighth place the Big Ten. Purdue suffered its sixth consecutive losing season. The team played home games at Ross–Ade Stadium in West Lafayette, Indiana.

Schedule

Personnel

Game summaries

Washington

Indiana State

at Notre Dame
 Eric Hunter 21/37, 354 yards

Minnesota

at Illinois

Ohio State
 Scott Hoffman 31/54, 317 yards

at Michigan State

Michigan

at Northwestern

at Iowa

Indiana

References

Purdue
Purdue Boilermakers football seasons
Purdue Boilermakers football